The 1982–83 NCAA Division I men's ice hockey season began in October 1982 and concluded with the 1983 NCAA Division I Men's Ice Hockey Tournament's championship game on March 26, 1983 at the Winter Sports Center in Grand Forks, North Dakota. This was the 36th season in which an NCAA ice hockey championship was held and is the 89th year overall where an NCAA school fielded a team.

Regular season

Season tournaments

Standings

1983 NCAA Tournament

Note: * denotes overtime period(s)

Player stats

Scoring leaders
The following players led the league in points at the conclusion of the season.

  
GP = Games played; G = Goals; A = Assists; Pts = Points; PIM = Penalty minutes

Leading goaltenders
The following goaltenders led the league in goals against average at the end of the regular season while playing at least 33% of their team's total minutes.

GP = Games played; Min = Minutes played; W = Wins; L = Losses; OT = Overtime/shootout losses; GA = Goals against; SO = Shutouts; SV% = Save percentage; GAA = Goals against average

Awards

NCAA

CCHA

ECAC

WCHA

See also
 1982–83 NCAA Division II men's ice hockey season
 1982–83 NCAA Division III men's ice hockey season

References

External links
College Hockey Historical Archives
1982–83 NCAA Standings

 
NCAA